This article contains information on rugby league played in 2007. The season commenced with the World Club Challenge and concluded with the New Zealand All Golds Tour in November.

January

February

22
Sydney: The list of Australian rugby league's 100 greatest players from 1908–2007 is announced.

23
 Bolton, England: The 2007 World Club Challenge is won by St. Helens  who defeated the Brisbane Broncos 18–14 at Reebok Stadium before 23,207.

March
18 – Brisbane, Australia: The Gold Coast Titans play their first ever match: a narrow 18–20 loss to the St George Illawarra Dragons at Suncorp Stadium before 42,030.

April
 20 – Brisbane, Australia: The 2007 ANZAC Test is won by Australia  30–6 against New Zealand at Suncorp Stadium before 35,241.

May
3 - Coffs Harbour, Australia: In the annual City vs Country Origin match City NSW defeat Country NSW 12–6 at BCU International Stadium before a crowd of just over 8,000.

June
 13 – Sydney: The 2007 State of Origin series is wrapped up by Queensland  in game two of the series at Telstra Stadium before 76,924.

July

August
 8 August – Moore Park, New South Wales: The 100-year anniversary of the formation of Australia's first rugby league governing body, the New South Wales Rugby League, is commemorated.
 18 August – Belgrade, Serbia: The 2007 European Shield ends and is won by Serbia  who finished on top of the table.
 25 August – London, England: The 2007 Challenge Cup tournament culminates in St. Helens'  30 – 8 win against Catalans Dragons in the final at Wembley Stadium before 84,241.
 25 August – Jacksonville, USA: The 2007 AMNRL season culminates in the Connecticut Wildcats'  20–18 win against Aston DSC Bulls in the championship match.

September
 4th – Sydney: The 2007 Dally M Awards are held and Johnathan Thurston   is named NRL player of the year.
6th – Australia: Rugby league film The Final Winter is released.
 9th – Auckland, New Zealand: The 2007 Bartercard Cup season culminates in the Auckland Lions'  28–4 win against Harbour League in the grand final.
 15th – Brisbane, Australia: The 2007 Queensland Cup season culminates in the Tweed Heads Seagulls'  28–18 win against the Redcliffe Dolphins in the grand final.
 22nd – Darwin, Australia: The 2007 Darwin Rugby League season culminates in the Litchfield Bears'  22–16 win against the University Sharks in the grand final.
 27th – Sydney, Australia: The 9th annual Tom Brock Lecture, entitled Nothing But a Nine-Day Wonder: The founding of rugby league – Australia’s first professional code, is delivered by Sean Fagan.
 30th – Sydney: The 2007 NRL season culminates in the minor premiers Melbourne Storm's  34–8 win against the Manly Warringah Sea Eagles in the 2007 NRL Grand Final. On 22 April 2010, the Melbourne Storm were stripped of the 2007 and 2009 premierships and the 2006–2008 minor premierships, after Storm officials confessed to the NRL that the club had committed serious and systematic breaches of the salary cap between 2006 and 2010 by running a well-organized dual contract and bookkeeping system which concealed a total of $3.17 million in payments made to players outside of the salary cap.

October
 13 October – Manchester, England: Super League XII culminates in the Leeds Rhinos'  33–5 win against minor premiers St. Helens in the 2007 Super League Grand Final.

November
10: Wigan, England – The Great Britain national rugby league team plays its last ever match: a 28 – 22	victory over New Zealand at JJB Stadium.
 17 November – Paris, France: The 2007 All Golds Tour, a repeat of the first ever international rugby league tour 100 years before, ends with a New Zealand  win against France.

December

Test Matches

ANZAC Test

Frontline Test

One off Tests

Trans-Tasman Test
Cameron Smith became the 67th player to captain Australia and did it in style scoring 1 try and 6 goals in Australia's 58–0 victory over New Zealand.

By playing in this match, Australian three-quarter back Israel Folau became the youngest Kangaroos test player in history at 18 years and 194 days.

Gillette Fusion All Golds' Centenary Tour

Three points for a try, as per inaugural Test in 1907.

Domestic Competitions

Australia

National Rugby League

The 2007 NRL Season will run from 16 March 2007 to 30 September 2007, with the latter date hosting the Grand Final at Sydney's Telstra Stadium.

State of Origin
2007 State of Origin series

Europe

Super League XII

The Super League is the top club competition in Europe. In 2007 there are eleven English teams and one French team in the 2007 season, known as Super League XII

Carnegie Challenge Cup

The Rugby League Challenge Cup is the most prestigious knock-out competition in the world of Rugby League. It features teams from across Europe including England, Scotland, Wales, France and Russia.

Catalans Dragons become the first non-English side to reach the final.  They will play holders St. Helens at Wembley Stadium on 25 August.

UK National Leagues

The National Leagues kick off on 5 April. There are two divisions, and the top team in National One has the opportunity to enter SuperLeague, subject to minimum standards.

References

External links
 "NZ League To Take Hard Line With NRL", xtraMSN website, retrieved 27 July 2006.
 " South Africa incentive for BARLA boys", Cumberland News, retrieved 6 October 2006.

 
Rugby league by year